Annibale Bugnini  (14 June 1912 – 3 July 1982) was a Catholic prelate. Ordained in 1936 and named archbishop in 1972, he was secretary of the commission that worked on the reform of the Catholic liturgy that followed the Second Vatican Council. Both critics and proponents of the changes made to the Roman Rite Mass and other liturgical practices before and after Vatican II consider him a dominant force in these efforts. He held several other posts in the Roman Curia and ended his career as papal nuncio to Iran, where he acted as an intermediary during the Iran hostage crisis of 1979 to 1981.

Early life and ordination
Annibale Bugnini was born in Civitella del Lago in Umbria.

He completed his doctorate in sacred theology at the Pontifical University of St. Thomas Aquinas Angelicum in 1938 with a dissertation entitled De liturgia eiusque momento in Concilio Tridentino.

He spent ten years in parish work in a suburb of Rome. In 1947 Bugnini became involved in the production of the missionary publications of his order and became the first editor of Ephemerides Liturgicæ, a scholarly journal dedicated to the reform of the Catholic liturgy. Starting in 1949, he taught liturgical studies at the Pontifical Urban College (now the Pontifical Urban University). He later became a professor at the Pontifical Lateran University.

Curial career
On 28 May 1948, Pope Pius XII appointed Bugnini secretary to the Commission for Liturgical Reform, which created a revised rite for the Easter Vigil in 1951 and revised ceremonies for the rest of Holy Week in 1955. The commission also made changes in 1955 to the rubrics of the Mass and office, suppressing many of the Church's octaves and a number of vigils, and abolishing the first vespers of most feasts. In 1960 the commission modified the Code of Rubrics, which led to new editions of the Roman Breviary in 1961 and of the Roman Missal in 1962.

On 25 January 1959, Pope John XXIII announced his plan to convene the Second Vatican Council. On 6 June 1960 Fr. Bugnini was named secretary of the Pontifical Preparatory Commission on the Liturgy. This body produced the first drafts of the document that, after many changes, would become the council's Constitution on the Sacred Liturgy (1963). When the council convened in October 1962, the Preparatory Commission was succeeded by the Conciliar Commission on the Sacred Liturgy, on which Bugnini was assigned the role of a peritus (expert). At the same time, Bugnini was removed from the chair of Liturgy at the Pontifical Lateran University because, in the words of Piero Marini, "his liturgical ideas were seen as too progressive." In his posthumously published memoirs, Second Vatican Council consultant Louis Bouyer called Bugnini "a man as bereft of culture as he was of basic honesty."
  
The council and Pope Paul VI approved the Constitution on the Liturgy on 4 December 1963. On 30 January 1964, the Pope appointed Bugnini secretary of the Council for the Implementation of the Constitution on the Liturgy. Bugnini was appointed the secretary of the Congregation for Divine Worship by Pope Paul in May 1969. In January 1965, he had become an undersecretary in the Congregation of Rites responsible for causes for beatification and canonization.

Diplomatic service
On 4 January 1976, Pope Paul named Bugnini pro-nuncio to Iran. Bugnini studied the country, its history, and traditions. The results of his researches appeared in 1981 as La Chiesa in Iran (The Church in Iran).

In 1979, Bugnini tried unsuccessfully to obtain, in the name of the Pope, the release of the American hostages being held at the United States embassy by followers of the Ayatollah Ruhollah Khomeini. He  met with Khomeini to deliver Pope John Paul II's appeal for the release of the hostages.

Death
Bugnini died of natural causes at the Pope Pius XI Clinic in Rome on 3 July 1982.

His detailed account of the work to which he devoted most of his career, The Reform of the Liturgy 1948-1975, appeared posthumously. An English translation was published in 1990.

Allegation
The oft-repeated allegation of Bugnini's being a Freemason, was first made in print by Italian essayist Tito Casini in his book Nel Fumo di Satana. Verso l'ultimo scontro (Florence: Il carro di San Giovanni, 1976). Casini claimed that according to an anonymous source, Bugnini left a briefcase in a conference room. When someone found it and attempted to identify the owner, incriminating documents were within. English writer Michael Davies claimed that Pope Paul VI's sending of Bugnini to Iran as nuncio was due to this alleged revelation of Bugnini's Masonic affiliation, though the task of his post-Vatican II congregation had just been completed (supra). Davies further claimed that an unnamed, conservative cardinal had told him in the summer of 1975 that he'd "seen (or placed) on the pope's desk" a "dossier" containing evidence of Bugnini's Freemason connection.

Bibliography
 La  Chiesa  in  Iran (The Church in Iran), 1981
 La Riforma Liturgica 1948-1975 (The Reform of the Liturgy, 1948-1975), 1983

References

1912 births
1983 deaths
People from the Province of Terni
Vincentians
Liturgists
Academic staff of the Pontifical Lateran University
20th-century Italian Roman Catholic titular archbishops
Participants in the Second Vatican Council
Vincentian bishops
Apostolic Nuncios to Iran
Freemasonry-related controversies